Franz Ferdinand are  a Scottish rock band formed in Glasgow in 2002. The band's original lineup was composed of Alex Kapranos (lead vocals and guitar, keyboard), Nick McCarthy (rhythm guitar, keyboards and backing vocals), Bob Hardy (bass guitar), and Paul Thomson (drums, percussion and backing vocals). Julian Corrie (keyboards, synthesiser, guitar and backing vocals) joined the band in 2017 after McCarthy left during the previous year. The band has been notable for being one of the more popular post-punk revival bands, garnering multiple UK top 20 hits. They have been nominated for several Grammy Awards and have received two Brit Awards – winning one for Best British Group – as well as one NME Award.

Best Art Vinyl
The Best Art Vinyl is an annual award that first began in 2005. It celebrates artists and designers of vinyl record cover art.

|-
| 2005
| You Could Have It So Much Better
| rowspan="2" | Best Art Vinyl
| 
|-
| 2006
| "The Fallen"
| 
|}

Brit Awards
The Brit Awards are the British Phonographic Industry's annual pop music awards.

|-
| rowspan="5" | 2005
| Franz Ferdinand
| British Album of the Year
| 
|-
| rowspan="7" | Franz Ferdinand
| British Breakthrough Act
| 
|-
| British Group
| 
|-
| British Rock Act
| 
|-
| British Live Act
| 
|-
| rowspan="3" | 2006
| British Group
| 
|-
| British Rock Act
| 
|-
| British Live Act
| 
|}

Danish Music Awards
The Danish Music Awards is a Danish award show.

|-
| rowspan="2" | 2005
| Franz Ferdinand
| Foreign Newcomer of the Year
| 
|-
| "Take Me Out"
| Foreign Hit of the Year
| 
|}

ECHO Awards
The ECHO Award is a German music award granted every year by the Deutsche Phono-Akademie, an association of recording companies.

|-
| 2006
| Themselves 
| Best International Rock/Alternative Act
|

Grammy Awards
The Grammy Award is an award presented by The Recording Academy to recognize achievement in the mainly English-language music industry.

|-
| rowspan="3" | 2005
| rowspan="2" | "Take Me Out"
| Best Rock Performance by a Duo or Group with Vocal
| 
|-
| Best Music Video
| 
|-
| Franz Ferdinand
| Best Alternative Music Album
| 
|-
| rowspan="2" | 2006
| "Do You Want To"
| Best Rock Performance by a Duo or Group with Vocal
| 
|-
| You Could Have It So Much Better
| Best Alternative Music Album
| 
|}

Hungarian Music Awards
The Hungarian Music Awards is the national music awards of Hungary, held every year since 1992 and promoted by Mahasz.

|-
| 2006
| You Could Have It So Much Better
| Best Foreign Rock Album
|

iHeartRadio Much Music Video Awards
The iHeartRadio Much Music Video Awards are annual awards presented by the Canadian television channel Much to honour the year's best music videos.

|-
| 2006
| "Do You Want To"
| Best International Group Video
| 
|}

Ivor Novello Awards
The Ivor Novello Awards are awards for songwriting and composing.

|-
| 2004
| "Take Me Out"
| Best Contemporary Song
| 
|}

Mercury Prize
The Mercury Prize is an annual music prize awarded for the best album from the United Kingdom and Ireland.

|-
| 2004
| Franz Ferdinand
| Nationwide Building Society Mercury Prize
| 
|}

Meteor Music Awards
The Meteor Music Awards was an accolade bestowed upon professionals in the music industry in Ireland and further afield.

|-
| rowspan="3" | 2005
| rowspan="2" | Franz Ferdinand
| Best Live Performance
| 
|-
| Best International Group
| 
|-
| Franz Ferdinand
| Best International Album
| 
|-
| 2006
| Franz Ferdinand
| Best International Group
| 
|}

MTV

Los Premios MTV Latinoamérica
The Los Premios MTV Latinoamérica was the Latin American version of the MTV Video Music Award.

|-
| 2004
| Franz Ferdinand
| Best New Artist – International
| 
|}

MTV Asia Awards
The MTV Asia Awards is the Asian equivalent of the Europe MTV Europe Music Award.

|-
| 2005
| "Take Me Out"
| Favorite Video
| 
|-
| rowspan="2" | 2006
| "Do You Want To"
| Favorite Video
| 
|-
| Franz Ferdinand
| Favorite Rock Act
| 
|}

MTV Australia Awards
The MTV Australia Awards started in 2005 and were Australia's first awards show to celebrate both local and international acts.

|-
| 2005
| Franz Ferdinand
| Best Breakthrough
| 
|}

MTV Europe Music Awards
The MTV Europe Music Award is an award presented by Viacom International Media Networks Europe to honour artists and music in pop culture.

|-
| rowspan="3" | 2004
| rowspan="5" | Franz Ferdinand
| Best New Act
| 
|-
| Best Alternative
| 
|-
| Best UK & Ireland Act
| 
|-
| 2005
| Best Rock
| 
|-
| 2013
| Best Alternative
| 
|}

MTV Video Music Awards
The MTV Video Music Award is an award presented by the cable channel MTV to honor the best in the music video medium.

|-
| rowspan="2" | 2004
| rowspan="2" | "Take Me Out"
| Breakthrough Video
| 
|-
| MTV2 Award
| 
|}

MTV Video Music Awards Japan
The MTV Video Music Awards Japan are the Japanese version of the MTV Video Music Award.

|-
| 2005
| "Take Me Out"
| Best New Artist
| 
|-
| rowspan="2" | 2009
| rowspan="2" | "Ulysses"
| Best Group Video
| 
|-
| Best Rock Video
| 
|}

MTVU Woodie Awards
The MTV Woodie Awards is an annual music show presented by MTVU with awards voted on by fans.

|-
| 2004
| Franz Ferdinand
| Soundtrack of My Life Woodie
| 
|}

NME Awards
The NME Awards is an annual music awards show in the United Kingdom.

|-
| rowspan="2" | 2004
| rowspan="4" | Franz Ferdinand
| Philip Hall Radar Award
| 
|-
| Best New Band
| 
|-
| rowspan="5" | 2005
| Best British Band
| 
|-
| Best Live Band
| 
|-
| Franz Ferdinand
| Best Album
| 
|-
| rowspan="2" | "Take Me Out"
| Best Track
| 
|-
| Best Video
| 
|-
| rowspan="5" | 2006
| rowspan="2" | Franz Ferdinand
| Best British Band
| 
|-
| Best Live Band
| 
|-
| You Could Have It So Much Better
| Best Album
| 
|-
| rowspan="2" | "Do You Want To"
| Best Track
| 
|-
| Best Video
| 
|}

Pollstar Concert Industry Awards

The Pollstar Concert Industry Awards is an annual award ceremony to honor artists and professionals in the concert industry.

|-
| 2005
| Themselves 
| Best New Touring Artist
|

Q Awards
The Q Awards are the UK's annual music awards run by the music magazine Q.

|-
| rowspan="5" | 2004
| Franz Ferdinand
| Best New Act
| 
|-
| Franz Ferdinand
| Best Album
| 
|-
| rowspan="2" | "Take Me Out"
| Best Track
| 
|-
| Best Video
| 
|}

Shortlist Music Prize
The Shortlist Music Prize was an annual music award for the best album released in the United States that had sold fewer than 500,000 copies at the time of nomination.

|-
| 2004
| Franz Ferdinand
| Shortlist Music Prize
| 
|}

Teen Choice Awards
The Teen Choice Awards is an annual awards show that airs on the Fox Broadcasting Company television network.

|-
| 2005
| Franz Ferdinand
| Choice Music: Rock Group
| 
|}

UK Music Video Awards
The UK Music Video Awards is an annual celebration of creativity, technical excellence and innovation in music video and moving image for music.

|-
| rowspan="3" | 2009
| "Ulysses"
| Best Indie/Alternative Video
| 
|-
| rowspan="2" | "No You Girls"
| Best Editing in a Video
| 
|-
| Best Styling in a Video
| 
|}

Other
In January Franz Ferdinand Shortlisted BBC Sound of 2004 Second Place.

In July 2009, Franz Ferdinand's "Take Me Out" was voted number 100 in Triple J Hottest 100 songs of all time.

References

Awards
Lists of awards received by British musician
Lists of awards received by musical group